Ugrai is a surname. Notable people with the surname include:

Max Ugrai (born 1995), German basketball player
Roland Ugrai (born 1992), Hungarian footballer